The 1932–33 Irish Cup was the 53rd edition of the premier knock-out cup competition in Northern Irish football. 

Glentoran won the tournament for the 5th time, defeating Distillery 3–1 in the second final replay at Windsor Park, after the previous two matches ended in draws.

Results

First round

|}

Replay

|}

Quarter-finals

|}

Replay

|}

Semi-finals

|}

Final

Replay

Second replay

References

External links
 Northern Ireland Cup Finals. Rec.Sport.Soccer Statistics Foundation (RSSSF)

Irish Cup seasons
1932–33 domestic association football cups
1932–33 in Northern Ireland association football